Willemina Hendrika "Ineke" Tigelaar  (born 9 October 1945) is a Dutch former freestyle swimmer who competed in the 1964 Summer Olympics. She won four medals at the 1962 European Aquatics Championships, including one gold in the 4 × 100 m freestyle relay. Between 1961 and 1964 she won six national titles in the 100 m, 400 m and 1500 m freestyle events. In 1962 and 1964 she was part of the Dutch teams that set new European records in the 4 × 100 m freestyle relay.

References

1945 births
Living people
Dutch female freestyle swimmers
Olympic swimmers of the Netherlands
Swimmers at the 1964 Summer Olympics
Sportspeople from Hilversum
European Aquatics Championships medalists in swimming
20th-century Dutch women